Beasley House may refer to:

in the United States

Beasley Homestead, Bethel Heights, Arkansas, listed on the National Register of Historic Places (NRHP) in Benton County
John M. Beasley House, Sarasota, Florida, NRHP-listed in Manatee County
Beasley House (Lavonia, Georgia), NRHP-listed in Franklin County
Craig-Beasley House, also known as Gaines House, in Franklin, Tennessee, NRHP-listed in Williamson County
Beasley-Parham House, near Greenbrier, Tennessee, NRHP-listed

See also
Beasley Building, Athens, Ohio, NRHP-listed
Beasley (disambiguation)